Elemental is an action-strategy video game written by Erick Dupuis and published by Lankhor in 1988. The player controls a green ball which freely evolves on the stage and which is pursued by two other balls. The first one is invincible and the player can only evade it using the environment to put some distance between them or by staying on one of the four "safe point" of the stage. The other follows the same rules, but it can also be stuck in holes present in the stage while following the green ball. In this case, another one will appear and continue following the player.

References

External links
 http://www.thelegacy.de/Museum/game.php3?titel_id=135&game_id=137
https://www.elementalgame.com/

1988 video games
Atari ST games
Atari ST-only games
Action video games
Strategy video games
Video games developed in France
Lankhor games
Multiplayer and single-player video games